Carrán-Los Venados is a volcanic group of scoria cones, maars and small stratovolcanoes in southern Chile, southeast of Ranco Lake. The volcanic group has recorded eruptions from 1955 and 1979. Located south of Maihue Lake and north Puyehue Volcano Carrán-Los Venados group is placed at the intersection of several faults on the thin crust (~30 km) of southern Chile, among them Liquiñe-Ofqui and Futrono Fault.

Volcanoes
Carrán - a waterfilled maar, erupted in 1955 (also called "Nilahue")
Mirador - a cinder cone, erupted in 1979
Pocura - a water filled maar, unknown date of eruption
Riñinahue - a non-waterfilled maar, erupted in 1907
Volcanes Los Venados - the western and southernmost group of volcanoes of Carrán-Los Venados group, unknown dates of eruption
Los Guindos - the tallest of the group, an extinct small stratocone

See also 
 List of volcanoes in Chile

References 
 

Müller, G. and Veyl, G., 1957. The birth of Nilahue, a new maar type volcano at Rininahue, Chile, 20th International Geological Congress, Mexico, pp. 75–396.

Volcanoes of Los Ríos Region
Cinder cones of Chile
Stratovolcanoes of Chile
Maars of Chile
Active volcanoes
Volcanic groups